Anne Casabonne (born January 9, 1970) is a Canadian actress and politician known for her roles as Claude Milonga in La Galère, Annie Surprenant in Unité 9, and Hélène in Complexe G.

Early life and career

Casabonne lost both her parents at an early age; her father at 15, and her mother at 21. She is the sister of multidisciplinary artist Jean-François Casabonne. Casabonne studied at the Université du Québec à Montréal in Interpretive Dramatic Arts between 1988 and 1991.

She first entered the acting world in the 1990s in the show Les Zigotos where she played, among others, the role of Nadine Trudeau and M.twit. She then played the role of Cléo in the popular youth show Macaroni tout garni which was broadcast on Télé-Québec. She played the role of Claude in the series La Galère, which was broadcast from 2007 to 2013 on Ici Radio-Canada Télé. From 2013-2019, she played in the drama TV series Unité 9, and in 2015 hosted Déco Top Chrono on Canal Vie.

From 2014 until the spring of 2021, she was a spokesperson for Accès pharma, a pharmacy network owned by Walmart.

In September 2021, the actress announced that she was "taking a break" from acting following a controversy regarding comments made in a Facebook post, in which she criticized the Covid-19 vaccine, François Legault and Christian Dubé, calling them "clowns." Subsequently, Walmart Canada publicly dissociated itself from her comments.

Entry into politics
On January 17, 2022, Casabonne announced that she had joined the Conservative Party of Quebec and would be its candidate for the upcoming by-election in the riding of Marie-Victorin. She came in fourth place with 10.41% of the total vote, which, despite losing, was hailed as a strong performance for the party as she surpassed the amount of votes given to the Quebec Liberal Party. On June 21, 2022, it was announced that Casabonne would be running in the 2022 Quebec general election in the riding of Iberville. The seat is currently held by Claire Samson, the only Conservative MNA at the time.

Personal life
Casabonne has a son, who she gave birth to four months after the passing of her mother.

Filmography

Film

Television

Electoral record

References

1970 births
Living people
Canadian voice actresses
Canadian actor-politicians
Canadian television actresses
20th-century Canadian actresses
21st-century Canadian actresses
21st-century Canadian politicians
21st-century Canadian women politicians